Stefan Gustavson (born 22 November 1965) is a retired Swedish ice hockey player. Gustavson was part of the Djurgården Swedish champions' team of 1991. Gustavson made 36 Elitserien appearances for Djurgården.

References

Swedish ice hockey players
Djurgårdens IF Hockey players
1965 births
Living people